Amyzon is an extinct genus belonging to the sucker family Catostomidae first described in 1872 by E. D. Cope. There are six valid species in the genus. Amyzon are found in North American fossil sites dated from the Early Eocene in Montana and Washington USA, as well as the British Columbian sites at McAbee Fossil Beds, Driftwood Canyon, and the "Horsefly shale", as well as Early Oligocene sites in Nevada USA. One Middle Eocene species is known from the Xiawanpu Formation of China.  The Ypresian species A. brevipinne of the Allenby Formation was redescribed in 2021 and moved to a separate monotypic genus Wilsonium.

Species 
There are six valid species included in Amyzon with up to nine species having been described.
 A. aggregatum  Early Eocene (Ypresian), Horsefly Beds, Horsefly, B.C.
 A. commune  late Eocene Florissant Formation, Colorado (junior synonyms A. fusiforme Cope, 1875 & A. pandatum Cope, 1874 )
 A. gosiutensis  Eocene Green River Formation
 A. hunanensis  Middle Eocene, Xiawanpu Formation, China
 A. kishenehnicum , Eocene, Kishenehn Formation, Montana
 A. mentale  Oligocene, Osino Oil Shales, Nevada

Moved from Amyzon 
 A. brevipinne  moved to Wilsonium brevipinne , Early Eocene, Allenby Formation, Tulameen River, British Columbia

References

Catostomidae
Fish of North America
Horsefly Shales
Coldwater Beds
Florissant Formation

pt:Sugador